Abisara fylloides is a butterfly in the family Riodinidae. It is found in Asia.

It was the first butterfly species of the Riodinidae to have its mitochondrial DNA sequenced.  The mitochondrial DNA has 15,301 base pairs.

Subspecies
Abisara fylloides fylloides (western China)
Abisara fylloides magdala (Fruhstorfer, 1904) (Indo China)

References

Butterflies described in 1901
Abisara